William Bustard (1894–1973) was an artist in Queensland, Australia. His stained glass work features in many heritage-listed buildings.

Early life
William Bustard was born in 1894 in Terrington, Malton, Yorkshire, England. Living close to the York Minster, he was influenced by its stained glass work and music. He studied at the Scarborough Art School and won a scholarship to the Slade School of Fine Art in London. He served in the British army in World War I and contracted tuberculosis. He immigrated in 1921 to Queensland, Australia where his health recovered.

Career

In order to make a living, he undertook a range of artistic work, including teaching and commissions. He illustrated books, including Robinson Crusoe (1949) and Treasure Island (1956).

He drew pictures for advertisements, including for:
 the Canberra Hotel in Brisbane

His stained glass work can be found in:
 Saint Mary's Catholic Church, Maryborough, Queensland
 Church of Saint Ignatius Loyola in Toowong, Brisbane
 St Thomas Church of England in Toowong, Brisbane
 Kurrowah, a mansion in Dutton Park, Brisbane
 St Pauls Presbyterian Church, Spring Hill, Brisbane
 RS Exton and Co Building in Brisbane
 St Brigids Catholic Church, in Rosewood
 St Barnabas Anglican Church, Red Hill

Later life
William Bustard died on 24 August 1973 in Southport, Queensland.

Exhibitions

Major exhibitions of his work include:
 1931
 1945: Brisbane
 1950: Finney's Art Gallery, Brisbane
 1983: Brisbane Civic Art Gallery and Museum
 2015–2016: Museum of Brisbane Painting with Light: an exhibition of the works of William Bustard  from June 2015 to January 2016 (over 70 original works)

References

Further reading

External links

 

20th-century Australian artists
1894 births
1973 deaths
Artists from Queensland
Alumni of the Slade School of Fine Art
Australian glass artists
British emigrants to Australia